The Lan tribe was one of the five member tribes of the old Xiongnu people who lived during the Han Dynasty in Northern Wei.

History
The Xiongnu people had five tribes: Luandi, Xubu, Huyan, Lan, and Qiulin. According to the Chinese assimilation policy of Xiaowen, the Xiongnu of Lan get the surname Lan (蘭). Their families are part of the Liu (劉) family of Han Zhao.

See also 

 Lan (surname 兰)

References
Book of the Later Han
Records of the Grand Historian

Xiongnu
Ancient peoples of China